2019 Universiade may refer to:

2019 Summer Universiade, a summer sporting event held in Italy
2019 Winter Universiade, a winter sporting event held in Russia